Salix uva-ursi, the bearberry willow, is a species of flowering plant in the family Salicaceae, native to subarctic and subalpine parts of northeastern North America and Greenland. A prostrate shrub, the extreme southern edge of its range is high in the mountains of northern New England.

References

uva-ursi
Flora of Nunavut
Flora of Quebec
Flora of Labrador
Flora of Newfoundland
Flora of Nova Scotia
Flora of New York (state)
Flora of Vermont
Flora of New Hampshire
Flora of Maine
Flora of Greenland
Plants described in 1814